The Devil's Cloth is a book by Michel Pastoureau. The book was originally published in July 2001. It is about the cultural biases surrounding striped patterns, and the cultural history of these patterns, in Western culture.

References

Further reading

2001 non-fiction books